Swinhoe's minivet or the brown-rumped minivet (Pericrocotus cantonensis) is a bird in the cuckooshrike family, Campephagidae. The species was first described by Robert Swinhoe in 1861.

It breeds in China and winters in Mainland Southeast Asia. Its natural habitats are temperate forest, subtropical or tropical moist lowland forest, and subtropical or tropical moist montane forest.

References

Swinhoe's minivet
Birds of China
Birds of Southeast Asia
Swinhoe's minivet
Taxonomy articles created by Polbot